Musa El Tayeb (known as Musa El Zoma) is a Sudanese footballer who currently plays for El-Merreikh.  He is a member of the Sudan National Football Team. He plays as left back.

He was born on 15 June 1984.

International goals

References

External links
 
 Profile from MTN Football website
 Profile from Sky Sports Website retrieved 7th Feb 2011

Living people
1984 births
Sudanese footballers
Sudan international footballers
Association football fullbacks
Al-Merrikh SC players
Al Ahli SC (Khartoum) players
Al-Ahly Shendi players
2008 Africa Cup of Nations players